Pedro Villagrán (23 June 1946 – 11 February 2022) was a Spanish politician who served as a PSOE Senator for Málaga province between 2004 and 2013. Born in Jerez de la Frontera Spain, he died on 11 February 2022, at the age of 75.

References

1946 births
2022 deaths
Members of the Senate of Spain
People from Málaga
Spanish Socialist Workers' Party politicians